Charles Hamilton (1834–1919) was a Canadian Anglican bishop who was the first Archbishop of Ottawa, Ontario and Metropolitan of Canada.

Hamilton was educated at the High School of Montreal and University College, Oxford. He was a curate of Quebec cathedral and then  incumbent of St Peter's Church in the same city. In 1884, he became the Bishop of Niagara. He was translated to become the Bishop of Ottawa in 1896 and was additionally elected as the Metropolitan of Canada in 1909 and then of Ontario in 1912. He died in 1919.

Family

Hamilton married Frances Louisa Hume Thomson, daughter of Tannatt Houston Thomson, Commissary-General of Canada, and his wife, Margaret Anne Ussher, the sister of Edgeworth Ussher. They lived at Bishopscourt, Ottawa, and were the parents of nine children: Charles Robert Hamilton, K.C. of Nelson, B.C.; Lilian Margaret (wife of Lenox I. Smith of Ottawa); Mabel Frances (wife of Edward Kirwan Martin of Hamilton, Ontario); Ethel Mary Hamilton; Hubert Valentine Hamilton; Winifred Katharine Hamilton; the Rev. Harold Francis Hamilton  (Professor of Pastoral Theology, Bishop's College, Lenoxville, Quebec); Mary Agnes (Molly) (actress in New York and London and correspondent of George Bernard Shaw); Lt. Col. George Theodore Hamilton of Ottawa and Victoria, B.C.

Ethel Mary Hamilton was born and educated in Quebec. She accompanied her parents on her father's election to the bishopric of the Ottawa, Ontario diocese in 1896. On May Day, 1898, at Government House, Ethel Mary Hamilton was elected and crowned "May Queen". She presided over the May Court Club, which had been established by the Earl and Countess of Aberdeen from 1896 until 1900.

References 

1834 births
1919 deaths
Alumni of University College, Oxford
Anglican bishops of Niagara
Anglican bishops of Ottawa
19th-century Anglican Church of Canada bishops
20th-century Anglican Church of Canada bishops
High School of Montreal alumni
Metropolitans of Canada
Metropolitans of Ontario
20th-century Anglican archbishops